Wings Out of Shadow is a 1983 video game published by Baen Enterprises for the Apple II.

Contents
Wings Out of Shadow is a game named for a Berserker short story by Fred Saberhagen, which players out the tale of the Hope, a hospital ship, its escort, the carrier Judith, and the Judith'''s outnumbered complement of nine fighters. Saberhagen wrote the in-game text.

Reception
John D. Burtt reviewed Wings Out of Shadow in Space Gamer No. 69. Burtt commented that "The programmers involved in this project did a very impressive job. Wings Out of Shadow'' is a good start for the Saberhagens, Berserker Works, Ltd., Baen Software, and perhaps, a whole new genre of computer game."

References

1983 video games
Apple II games
Apple II-only games